Charles Edward McCarthy (November 17, 1889 – November 30, 1969) was a Canadian professional ice hockey player. He played with the Montreal Wanderers of the National Hockey Association during the 1914–15 season as a starting goaltender. Prior to that he had played with the Toronto Argonauts and teams from Bassano, Calgary and Cobalt.

McCarthy was also a professional boxer and a Canadian lightweight boxing champion.

References

1889 births
1969 deaths
Canadian ice hockey goaltenders
Ice hockey people from Ottawa
Montreal Wanderers (NHA) players